The Iloca was a 35mm rangefinder camera produced from 1952 to 1959 by Wilhelm Witt of Hamburg. Models designated "Rapid" had a rapid winding lever.

The Iloca was the first 35mm camera with an integrated electric motor wind. It was very expensive and sold poorly in Europe, but was much more successful in the USA where it was sold as the Graphic 35 Electric.

The company was acquired by Agfa in 1960, and the Iloca Electric was re-introduced as the Agfa Selecta m, with a fixed f2.8 Solinar lens in place of the interchangeable bayonet mount.

Iloca cameras
 Iloca IIa
 Iloca Stereo II - 1951
 Iloca Rapid (A) - 1952
 Iloca Rapid B / Sears Tower 51 - 1954
 Iloca Rapid I - 1956
 Iloca Rapid IL / MPP Iloca - 1956
 Iloca Rapid IIL / Sears Tower 52 / Argus V-100 - 1956
 Iloca Rapid III - 1959
 Iloca Automatic
 Iloca Electric / Graphic 35 Electric - 1959

External links
 Iloca Rapid at Tigin's Classic Cameras
 Repair notes of the Iloca Rapid (A), Iloca Rapid B and Iloca IIa at Daniel Mitchell's camera site

Rangefinder cameras